Mune: Guardian of the Moon (French: Mune, le gardien de la lune) is a 2014 French 3D computer-animated adventure fantasy film directed by Benoît Philippon and Alexandre Heboyan and written by Jérôme Fansten and Benoît Philippon. Set in an imaginary world, the movie tells the adventure of the guardian of the Moon who must recover the stolen Sun. The film was made with computer graphics and 3D stereoscopy, and it features the voices of Michael Gregorio, Omar Sy and Izïa Higelin. The film premiered at Forum des images on 6 December 2014 and was theatrically released in France on 14 October 2015.

It earned $14.5 million on a reported $17 million budget. It also received nominations for the Annecy International Animated Film Festival for Cristal Award for Best Feature Film and the World Soundtrack Award for Soundtrack Composer of the Year for the film's music composer, Bruno Coulais. The film won the Young People's Jury Award at the TIFF Kids International Film Festival and the Best Film Award at the Tokyo Anime Awards.

Plot

In an imaginary world, a small Sun and Moon were made by the first Guardians to warm up a small planet inhabited by different, but marvelous, people. The Guardians, generation after generation, preserve the harmony of the world. The people of the day and those of the night live in relative harmony, even though they are very different from each other. But, in the depth of the planet, Necross, a failed, corrupted Guardian of the Sun who has once trying to steal the Sun for himself and then banished by mighty warrior Xolal for it, awaits the opportunity to set darkness over the world.

The day is approaching when the Sun's apprentice guardian, Sohone, and the Moon's apprentice guardian, Leeyoon, will take over from the present Guardians of the Sun and Moon (an old Xolal and Yule, respectively).  On the day of their induction, the light of the Sun accepts Sohone as planned, but Leeyoon is vetoed by the lunar Ewe, who chooses a young troubling, unexperienced Faun boy named Mune instead. An impulsive imp called Mox, who’s a servant of Necross, inform the latter about Xolal’ s retirement, Necross see this as an opportunity to steal the Sun again. After the ceremony and show what to do to their successors, the old Guardians passing (Yule turns into a small field of tall glowing plant-like trees and Xolal turns into a stone statue). On the following night, an upset Leeyoon is visited by pale snakes, send by Necross, to stir up his jealousy and advise him to pit Sohone against Mune. Meanwhile, Mune has troubles maneuvering the temple of the Moon correctly: the temple leaves its path and interferes with Sohone. While Sohone leaves his temple after Leeyoon convinced him to scold Mune, Necross sends Mox and his shy, nature lover imp partner Spleen, to steal the Sun and bring it to him. Necross makes the Sun die off gradually, to make sure that no one would take it from him. Night falls everywhere, and a distressed Mune is banished from his own people.

Mune and Sohone both set out on a quest to find the vanished Sun, accompanied by a young wax girl named Glim. Thanks to her knowledge of astronomy and the ancient stories of how the world came together, the group is able to pass the Great Blue Hole, a lake under which the great abyss opens that leads to the depths of the world. Mune watches over Glim since she could freeze and break in the cold water. While underwater, the group meets Phospho, a failed previous Guardian of the Moon from the same generation as Necross, but, due to his cowardice, he give up his position after he failed to stop Necross instead of Xolal. He wakes Glim up using his power and leads them to the entrance of the underworld, where Necross lives.

Meanwhile, Leeyoon takes Mune's place in the temple of the Moon, but he can't control it. The Moon wanes and crumbles into dust, causing the temple to go mad and start galloping everywhere. It ends up in the underworld where Mune, Sohone and Glim are. Mune, accompanied by Glim, takes care of the Moon while Sohone dives into the underworld to recover the Sun. Mune figures out that he can calm the temple of the Moon by using his magic glitter powers, inspiring Phospho, who had watched from afar. Leeyoon admits to him that the Moon is lost, but Mune and Glim go into the moon quarry of the world of dreams, that Yule inform Mune about before he passed away, to carve a new crescent like the first Guardian of the Moon did before. As the new Moon is ready but could not shine without the Sun, while Mune, who had tested his powers against nightmares, and Glim developed feelings for each other. A guilt-ridden Leeyoon then apologizing to Mune for his actions, recognizing him as the true Guardian of the Moon.

With this task done, Mune and Glim rejoin Sohone in the world of darkness. During this time, Sohone is surrounded by a mass of pale snakes who taunt and provoke him, trying to make him go mad with hatred. Sohone is saved by Phospho's intervention, who sacrifices himself to calm and free Sohone, destroying the snake wall in the process. Sohone, Mune and Glim then confront Necross and his imps. Sohone goes against Necross, but doesn't manage to weaken him. Mune finally gets rid of Mox, while Spleen failed with Glim due to his harmless nature. Glim finds the Sun and blows on it to revive its fire, but that causes her to melt. As Glim in her last breath encourages him of how powerful are his powers and that he can defeat Necross, a heartbroken Mune sobs over Glim's sacrifice. As Necross is about to crush Mune and Sohone, the Sun and the Moon, now together, shines and empowering Mune and Sohone’s powers, stopping Necross from crushing them with Sohone’s strength. Then Mune uses his Dream powers to defeat Necross and realises that Necross was being influenced by a pale snake, which he then pulls out and destroys. Necross regains the Guardian of the Sun appearance he had before getting corrupted by greed, then turns to stone, passing into eternal sleep in harmony, while the underworld changes into a paradise too, along with a despondent Mox and a happy Spleen.

The defeat of Necross leads to peace for the world, and the two young Guardians are able to resume the normal trajectories of their temples. Mune also re-sculpts Glim, and the combined energy of the sun and moon at daybreak with Glim's held fragment of the moon revives her, and give her wax the ability to not melt, freeze, or crack whatever if it is day or night. Mune and Glim meet up and kiss, before going around the world on the temple of the Moon.

Cast

Production
The original idea of the film was born with a project from writer Benoît Philippon, who planned to start a short live action film in an atmosphere inspired by Terry Gilliam movies: the story of a character who lives in a forest and wins the Moon, spearing it with a rope. The project soon proved to be unfeasible in a short format and Benoît Philippon started to turn it into a feature film project. He developed and created a more complex poetic universe with its own cosmogony and different inhabitants related to the Sun and the Moon. The universe further formed with the contribution of Nicolas Marlet who designed the characters, and Aurelian Prédal, artistic director of the film. The human characters were designed as hybrids between human beings, animals and various materials. Mune is a woodland creature with fur and is related to the night; his shy and taciturn nature is inspired by the main character of Tim Burton's Edward Scissorhands film. Sohone is linked to the Sun and his body is made from amber; his "big mouth" personality is inspired by characters like Buzz Lightyear from Pixar's animated film Toy Story or Han Solo from Star Wars. Glim is made from wax which makes her fragile and endangered when she is exposed to sunlight, but it is an opportunity to show a character with a disability, struggling to compensate for it with her courage. The lord of evil Necross with his two imps, Mox and Spleen, are volcanoes, giving opportunity to work on lava and soot textures. The script was co-written by Benoît Philippon and Jerome Fansten. He knows of several rewrites, including changes that were made while writing the storyboard for the visual development of the film that saw the birth of new ideas, including that of the mobile temples in the world of Mune. The stakes of the plot, defined very early, was the idea of characters going in search of the Sun like a Holy Grail. The challenge of the project was to develop a classic film understandable by a wide audience, including younger people, without sacrificing originality and the poetry of the world designed for Mune. The film was directed mainly in CGI, except for some scenes about the past of the planet and those occurring in the world of dreams, which are made in 2D animation.

Music and soundtrack
The film’s original music was composed and orchestrated by Bruno Coulais (composer of Coraline and Song of the Sea). The soundtrack also contains “Happy” written and performed by C2C and Derek Martin. The soundtrack was released on October 16, 2015.

Release
It made its première at Forum des images on 6 December 2014. It made its North American premiere at the New York International Children's Film Festival on 14 March 2015. The film was part of the official selection at the Annecy International Animated Film Festival in 2015.

The film was released in cinemas in France on 14 October 2015 by Paramount Pictures.

In France the day of its release, Wednesday, October 14, 2015, Mune: Guardian of the Moon had done relatively well in Paris with a startup to 457 entries in the day on 14 screens where the film is operated in the capital, which ranks fifth among films released that day. In the first week, the film had 128 279 entries. At the end of 2015, Mune: Guardian of the Moon combines 524,000 entries and is one of 100 French films attracted the most viewers in 2015.

In the United States, GKIDS released the film to theaters for a one-day only event on August 12, 2017. In contrast to the original dub, their release redubbed some of the voices with Rob Lowe, Christian Slater, Patton Oswalt, Ed Helms and Jeff Dunham. It had a home video release on September 26, 2017 by Universal Pictures Home Entertainment.

Reception
During its release in France in October, 2015 Mune: Guardian of the Moon was well received by press critics. The main recognised qualities of the film are its aesthetics and its world, the latter considered poetic and original. In the French free daily 20 Minutes, Caroline Vié speaks of "extraordinary aesthetics" and she believes that the film "surprises people constantly with its inventiveness." In Première, Christopher Narbinne speaks about an "inventive artistic direction" and about "unique character designs". In L'Express, Eric Libiot maintains that the film is "splendid and moving" and shows that "French animation is in a really good shape" with an "ambitious" animation and a universe that "intermingles mythology, is universal and tries to remain open for all". In the women's magazine Elle, Helena Villovith judges that "the poetic quality of the characters, the richness of the setting and the mood of the dreamlike sequences do not have to pale before classics such as Toy Story or Princess Mononoke." Critics are divided on the quality of the scripts: generally welcomed, it leaves some critics less convinced. In L'Express, Eric Libiot judges it "beautiful and intelligent"; he describes the scenario as "romantic" and appreciates that it "escalates to a progressive film" and that "the pace of it takes its time voluntarily". In Le Dauphiné Libéré, Jean Serroy believes that it is all "very inventive in terms of characters and adventures, perfect for a family viewing". In Le Journal du dimanche, Barbara Théate saw the film as a "story for toddlers, rich with wacky characters and fun twists". It is "an original work with sophistication" according to Philippe Lauguche from Quest France. The Télérama magazine considers it "magical and terrifically effective" under the pen of Guillemette Odicino, who recognises various influences: the faun Mune reminds him of the world of Luc Besson, Glim that of Tim Burton, while the marvelous creatures remind him of the films of Hayao Miyazaki and the paintings of Salvador Dalí. In the film magazine Première, Christophe Narbonne recognises a certain poetry to the film, but finds the scenario "very formal" and he thinks that it does not live up to its aesthetics. In her review for Elle, Helena Villovitch regrets that "the only girl's role is decorative, fluttering her eyelashes and admiring the prowess of males who get promoted to positions of responsibility. Still, she's the one we love the most!"

Awards 
The film was submitted as one of the 27 animated feature films in consideration for the Best Animated Feature for the 89th Academy Awards.

Accolades

References

External links

 
 
 

2014 films
2014 3D films
2014 fantasy films
2014 computer-animated films
2014 directorial debut films
2010s French animated films
2010s children's adventure films
2010s children's fantasy films
2010s children's animated films
2010s fantasy adventure films
2010s English-language films
2010s French-language films
French 3D films
French computer-animated films
French children's adventure films
French animated fantasy films
French fantasy adventure films
Animated adventure films
3D animated films
English-language French films
Sun in film
Moon in film
Fiction about the Sun
Fiction set on the Moon
Films scored by Bruno Coulais
Paramount Pictures films
Paramount Pictures animated films
Method Animation films
2010s American films